Gložje is a village in the municipality of Bosilegrad, Serbia.

Populated places in Pčinja District